Nutopia is a conceptual country, sometimes referred to as a micronation, founded by John Lennon and Yoko Ono. One of the reasons that the country was founded was to address Lennon's then-ongoing immigration problems (the previous week he received a deportation order) through satirical means.

There is no leadership and not all citizenships have been recorded. As a result, the population is unknown.

Nutopia is a portmanteau of "new" and "utopia" which suggests Nutopia is a new, utopian society.

History

On 2 April 1973 Lennon and Ono introduced the conceptual country of Nutopia at a press conference in New York City.

Lennon and Ono declared themselves ambassadors of the country and sought diplomatic immunity to end Lennon's ongoing immigration troubles as he and Ono tried to remain in the United States. (Ono already had a Resident Alien "green card" through her previous husband, Tony Cox. Lennon had been denied permanent residence status.) Lennon talked about the imaginary country, which would live up to the ideals of his song "Imagine", saying this in the "official" declaration, signed the day before:

We announce the birth of a conceptual country, NUTOPIA. Citizenship of the country can be obtained by declaration of your awareness of NUTOPIA. NUTOPIA has no land, no boundaries, no passports, only people. NUTOPIA has no laws other than cosmic. All people of NUTOPIA are ambassadors of the country. As two ambassadors of NUTOPIA, we ask for diplomatic immunity and recognition in the United Nations of our country and its people.

Lennon's deportation order was overturned in 1975. The following year, he received his green card, certifying his permanent residency, and ended talks about Nutopia.

In 2006, a Nutopia website was created that forwarded to a site about the documentary The U.S. vs. John Lennon, distributed by Lions Gate Entertainment. The Nutopian Embassy is located at 1 White Street in the Tribeca neighborhood of Manhattan.

Symbols

The flag of Nutopia has only one colour: white. At the press conference Lennon, waving a white tissue, stated, "This is the flag of Nutopia—we surrender, to peace and to love". According to a reporter for The New York Times, Lennon blew his nose on the tissue. Some criticised this association with surrender, but Lennon and Ono defended the association, saying that only through surrender and compromise could peace be achieved.

Lennon's album Mind Games (1973) features the "Nutopian International Anthem", which consists of four seconds of silence.

The hand-drawn Great Seal of Nutopia features a picture of a seal balancing a yin-yang globe on its nose.

A plaque engraved with the words "NUTOPIAN EMBASSY" was installed at the back (kitchen) entrance to the Dakota apartment where Lennon and Ono lived. Ono remarked decades later that guests preferred walking into her home through that door instead of the front entrance.

Legacy 
Finnish singer-songwriter Kari Peitsamo, fan of Lennon's work, released a song called "Nutopia" on his album I'm Down.

In 2009 an exhibit in New York displayed the letter that established Nutopia.

References

External links
 Nutopianism A conceptual road to Nutopia

John Lennon
Micronations
Yoko Ono